A shepherd is a person who herds sheep.

Shepherd may also refer to:

People
 Shepherd (name)

Places

United States
 Shepherd, Indiana, an unincorporated town
 Shepherd, Michigan, a village
 Shepherd, Montana, a census-designated place
 Shepherd, Texas, a city

Elsewhere
 Shepherd Islands, Vanuatu
 23060 Shepherd, an asteroid
 The Heavenly Shepherd, the Babylonian name for the constellation Orion (constellation)

In the arts
 The Shepherd, a 1975 novella by Frederick Forsyth
 The Shepherd (Blake), a 1789 poem by William Blake
 The Shepherd: Border Patrol, a 2008 American action film
 "The Shepherd" (Once Upon a Time)
 Shepherd Sisters, a 1950s vocal quartet
 "Shepherd", a song by Genesis found on Genesis Archive 1967–75 and Extra Tracks 1970–1975
 Shepherd (film), a 2021 British horror drama

Other uses
 Shepherd Express, an alternative weekly newspaper published in Milwaukee, Wisconsin
 Shepherd University, Shepherdstown, West Virginia
 Shepherd School of Music, Rice University, Houston, Texas
 Shepherd Center, a private hospital in Atlanta, Georgia
 Shepherd Hall (Monument Place), Wheeling, West Virginia, a house on the National Register of Historic Places 
 Shepherd Building Group, one of the largest privately owned building groups in the UK
 Baron Shepherd, a title in the peerage of the United Kingdom
 Shepherding (Australian rules football)
 German Shepherd dog
 Shepherd (Firefly), a character in the TV series Firefly

See also
 Shepherd satellite, a small moon that may orbit near a planetary ring
 Shepard (disambiguation)
 Sheppard (disambiguation)
 Justice Shepherd (disambiguation)